Eucalyptus valens is a species of mallet, a tree lacking a lignotuber, that is endemic to near-coastal areas of southern Western Australia. It has smooth bark, lance-shaped adult leaves, flower buds in groups of seven and cup-shaped fruit.

Description
Eucalyptus valens is a mallet that typically grows to a height of  but does not form a lignotuber. It has smooth white, pale grey or cream-coloured bark.

Taxonomy and naming
Eucalyptus valens was first formally described in 2001 by Lawrie Johnson and Ken Hill in the journal Telopea from specimens collected by Ian Brooker near Lake King in 1977. The specific epithet (valens) is from a Latin word meaning to be vigorous or strong, referring to the habit of this species.

Distribution and habitat
This mallet grows in woodland on the subcoastal plain from near Mount Ragged in the Cape Arid National Park to Scaddan and Salmon Gums.

Conservation status
This eucalypt is classified as "not threatened" by the Western Australian Government Department of Parks and Wildlife.

See also
List of Eucalyptus species

References

valens
Endemic flora of Western Australia
Mallees (habit)
Myrtales of Australia
Eucalypts of Western Australia
Trees of Australia
Plants described in 2001
Taxa named by Lawrence Alexander Sidney Johnson
Taxa named by Ken Hill (botanist)